Alsophila balanocarpa, synonym Cyathea balanocarpa, is a species of tree fern native to Cuba, Jamaica and Hispaniola. Despite its wide distribution, little is known about this species. It is apparently of hybrid origin.

In southeastern Cuba it hybridises with Alsophila woodwardioides to form the natural hybrid Alsophila × boytelii.

References

balanocarpa
Flora of Cuba
Flora of the Dominican Republic
Flora of Haiti
Flora of Jamaica
Flora without expected TNC conservation status